Cloesia digna is a moth of the subfamily Arctiinae. It is found in Costa Rica.

References

Lithosiini